Henry Jackson Morton (December 11, 1836 – May 9, 1902) was a United States scientist and the first president of the Stevens Institute of Technology.

Education and early career
He was the son of Rev. Henry Morton (1807–1890), a clergyman who was rector of St. James's church in Philadelphia for many years and a trustee of the University of Pennsylvania. Henry J. Morton graduated from the University of Pennsylvania in 1857, and became professor of physics and chemistry at the Episcopal Academy of Philadelphia in 1860. In 1863, he delivered a series of lectures on chemistry at the Franklin Institute. A year later, he was appointed resident secretary at Franklin Institute, where he continued his lectures. His lectures on light attracted attention throughout the United States and Europe by reason of his brilliant and unique experiments. He continued as resident secretary until 1870.

He was one of the founders of the Philadelphia Dental College in 1863 and its first professor of chemistry. From 1867 to 1868, during the absence of John F. Frazer, he was invited to fill the chair of professor of physics and chemistry at the University of Pennsylvania. In 1869, the chair was divided, and Morton received the chemistry professorship. In 1867, he became editor of the Franklin Institute Journal. That same year, he was elected as a member to the American Philosophical Society.

He conducted the photographic branch of the United States eclipse expedition to Iowa in 1869, under the auspices of the U. S. Nautical Almanac office. In addition to securing several excellent photographs of the eclipse, he proved that the bright line of the sun's disc adjacent to the moon is due to a chemical action in the process of developing the plate and not to diffraction as had hitherto been proposed by Sir George B. Airy.Also he was a member of the private expedition that was organized by Henry Draper to observe the total solar eclipse of 29 July 1878 at Rawlins, Wyoming.

The degree of Ph.D. was conferred on him by Dickinson College in 1869, and by Princeton University in 1871. He was a member of scientific societies, and in 1874 was elected to membership in the National Academy of Sciences, on whose commissions he has occasionally served. Besides writing numerous papers on electricity and fluorescence, he assisted in the preparation of The Student's Practical Chemistry (1868). In 1859 he made the lithographic drawings for a publication of a translation of the trilingual hieroglyphic inscription of the Rosetta Stone.

In 1873 he conducted a series of researches on the "Fluorescent and Absorption Spectra of the Uranium Salts", and also on the like spectra of pyrene, and of a new material found by him in some petroleum residues to which he gave the name of thallene, from its brilliant green fluorescence. His reputation as a scientist became worldwide and his services as a chemical expert were eagerly sought in litigation. In 1878, he succeeded to the vacancy on the United States Lighthouse Board that was caused by the death of Joseph Henry, which appointment he held until 1885, conducting meanwhile investigations on fog signals, electric lighting, fire extinguishers, illuminating buoys, and like subjects, which appear in the annual reports of the Board.

Stevens Institute of Technology

In 1870, he was chosen president of the newly founded Stevens Institute of Technology, and under his direction the faculty was selected and the course of instruction formed. His management of the institute made it one of the leading technological schools of the country. He gave it the benefit not only of his great learning, but also several gifts in the establishment and endowment of various necessary departments:  In 1880, he presented to the trustees a workshop that he had caused to be built and equipped with steam engines and tools at a cost of $10,000; again, in 1883, he gave $2,500 for the purchase of electrical apparatus.

Per aspera ad astra

Morton frequently dabbled in poetry; he delivered the Valedictory speech for his University class of 1857 in verse.  Throughout his life he would compose lengthy poems related to events in his life. In celebration of the Twenty-fifth Anniversary Celebration of Stevens Institute of Technology, Morton prepared a poem based on the Stevens Family motto "Per Aspera ad Astra".

Notes

References

 This article is nominally for his father, but Henry Morton is the subject of most of it.

External links
 

1836 births
1902 deaths
University of Pennsylvania alumni
University of Pennsylvania faculty
Presidents of Stevens Institute of Technology
American chemists
Members of the United States National Academy of Sciences